Alembic Group is an Indian conglomerate headquartered in Vadodara. It was founded in 1907 and was initially known as Alembic Chemical Works Company Ltd. The company was founded by Prof. T.K. Gajjar, Prof. A.S. Kotibhasker and B.D. Amin. It is one of the oldest industrial houses in India and has a diversified portfolio of business. Their major businesses include, pharmaceuticals, healthcare, engineering, chemicals and glassware production. In 2014–2015, the market cap of Alembic Group was ₹9,578 crore while its turnover was ₹2,200 crore.

History
Alembic Group initially began with primary focus on production of tinctures, alcohol, vitamins, penicillin, and eventually active pharmaceutical ingredients (API) thus majorly having a brief focus on the pharmaceutical business. However, in 2010, the group demerged its pharmaceutical business, thereby making it to be separate entity called Alembic Pharmaceuticals Ltd.

Subsidiaries
This section lists the various businesses under Alembic Group.

Pharmaceutical
The Alembic Pharmaceuticals Ltd. is a public listed company belonging to the Alembic Group. It is involved in manufacture of pharmaceutical substances, pharmaceutical products and intermediates.

Real estate
Alchemy Real Estate is the real estate arm of Alembic Group and is involved in developing residential townships, industrial plants, schools, commercial offices and hospitals majorly in the state of Gujarat. In November 2014, Alchemy Real Estate launched its first project in the city of Bengaluru – Karnataka.

Glassware
Shreno Ltd. formerly known as Alembic Glass Industries Ltd. is a business of Alembic Group dedicated to glassware manufacturing. Shreno Ltd. is involved in manufacture of table glassware under its brand name .

Philanthropy

Schools
The Alembic Group through its Uday Education Trust has established Alembic Group of Schools. The group has five schools which aid in providing affordable and high quality education to children based in Vadodara and Bangaluru. The Schools established are enlisted below.
 D. R. Amin Memorial School, Vadodara
 Utkarsh Vidyalaya, Vadodara
 Tejas Vidyalaya, Vadodara
 Alembic Vidyalaya, Vadodara

Hospitals
Alembic Group has established Bhailal Amin General Hospital (BAGH), a tertiary care multi-specialty hospital in Vadodara. BAGH is the only hospital approved by the state and the central government of India to conduct cardiac treatment, surgery, kidney transplants/surgery and cadaver transplants.

References

External links
 

Companies based in Vadodara
Chemical companies established in 1907
Conglomerate companies established in 1907
Indian companies established in 1907
Companies listed on the National Stock Exchange of India
Companies listed on the Bombay Stock Exchange